Michael O'Sullivan (born February 18, 1995), also known as Mike O'Sullivan, is an English-American soccer player.

Career

College and amateur
O'Sullivan played four years of college soccer; one year at Eastern Florida State College in 2013 before transferring to Palm Beach Atlantic University in 2014.

During his time at college, O'Sullivan played with Premier Development League sides Orlando City U-23 and South Florida Surf.

Professional
O'Sullivan signed with NASL club Jacksonville Armada FC on February 14, 2017 He made his league debut for the club on May 6, 2017, coming on as an 87th minute substitute for J. C. Banks in a 1-1 draw with the New York Cosmos.

After a season with Palm Beach United of the National Premier Soccer League, O'Sullivan signed with USL League One side Tormenta FC. He made his league debut for the club on May 25, 2019, coming on for Jad Arslan in the 75th minute of a 0-0 draw with Lansing Ignite FC.

References

External links
 
 Michael O'Sullivan at Armada FC

1995 births
Living people
American soccer players
Association football defenders
Jacksonville Armada FC players
Orlando City U-23 players
Soccer players from Orlando, Florida
South Florida Surf players
Tormenta FC players
USL Championship players
USL League One players
USL League Two players